Adaon Kalalla (born 7 January 1991 in Kinshasa, Zaire) is a Belgium footballer who last played for Othellos Athienou.

Career
Kalala began his career with R.U.S. Albert Schaerbeek and joined R.S.C. Anderlecht in 2006. He was promoted to the senior team on 3 May 2007. He played his first game for R.S.C. Anderlecht on 2 May 2007. After three years left R.S.C. Anderlecht and signed on 4 August 2009 a two years contract for KSK Beveren.

International
Kalala played for his homeland Congo DR national football team on Under 19 Level and was former member of the Under 15 team from Belgium.

References

External links

1991 births
Footballers from Kinshasa
Belgian Pro League players
Belgian footballers
Belgium youth international footballers
Democratic Republic of the Congo emigrants to Belgium
Association football midfielders
Democratic Republic of the Congo footballers
Democratic Republic of the Congo youth international footballers
Living people
R.S.C. Anderlecht players